The town of Jupiter Island is located on the barrier island called Jupiter Island, in Martin County, Florida, United States; the town is part of Florida's Treasure Coast. The town is located next to the unincorporated community of Hobe Sound. The population of Jupiter Island was 804 at the 2020 census. Some of the wealthiest people in the United States live in Jupiter Island: the June 1999 issue of Worth magazine ranked it #1 in the country for having the highest median home sale, and it has the highest per capita income by ZIP Code Tabulation Area of any place in the US.

Geography
The town of Jupiter Island is located at  (27.057287, –80.113616). It occupies the barrier island of the same name from the Palm Beach County line in the south to the Hobe Sound National Wildlife Refuge boundary in the north. It is bordered to the west by Hobe Sound and South Jupiter Narrows, and to the east by the Atlantic Ocean.

Demographics

As of the census of 2010, there were 817 people, 429 households, and 219 families residing in the town. The population density was  based on total area, and 303.4 people per square mile (117.1/km) based on land area.  There were 762 housing units at an average density of 283.0 per square mile of land area (109.3/km).  The racial makeup of the town was 94.37% White (88.49% non-Hispanic), 2.20% African American, 2.57% Asian, and 0.61% from other races. No one in the community identified as a Pacific Islander, or with two or more races. Hispanics or Latinos of any race were 5.32% of the population.

There were 429 households, of which 4.4% had children under the age of 18 living with them, 49.4% were married couples living together, 1.4% had a female householder with no husband present, one had a male householder with no wife present, and 49.0% were non-families. 42.9% of households were made up of individuals; 18.9% had someone living alone who was 65 years of age or older.  The average household size was 1.74 and the average family size was 2.25.

The age distribution was 4.0% under the age of 18, 4.3% from 18 to 24, 16.9% from 25 to 44, 27.2% from 45 to 64, and 47.6% who were 65 years of age or older.  The median age was 63.7 years. For every 100 females, there were 106.3 males.  For every 100 females age 18 and over, there were 103.6 males.

The median income for a household in the town was $199,167, and the median income for a family was over $250,000 (the Census Bureau was not able to determine an exact amount). Full-time male workers had a median income of $191,000 versus $88,889 for females. The per capita income for the town was $254,260.  9.2% of the population and 2.5% of families were below the poverty line.

Ancestry
As of 2017 the largest self-reported ancestry groups in Jupiter Island are:
English – 21.7%
American – 12.3%
Irish – 11.5%
German – 9.7%
Scottish – 6.2%
Italian – 4.3%

Notable people

Government and business
Steve Bisciotti, owner of the Baltimore Ravens and Aerotek
Dorothy Walker Bush, wife of Prescott Bush and mother of George H. W. Bush
George H. W. Bush, U.S. President, Director of the Central Intelligence Agency, and father of George W. Bush
Prescott Bush, politician, founding member of the Union Banking Corporation, and father of George H. W. Bush
Robert W. Daniel, Jr., former U.S. Congressman from Virginia
C. Douglas Dillon, U.S. Secretary of the Treasury, and U.S. National Security Council executive
Nelson Doubleday, publisher
W. Averell Harriman, U.S. Ambassador to Britain and USSR, Governor of New York, and founder of Brown Brothers Harriman
Richard Lerner, research chemist, entrepreneur, and former president of The Scripps Research Institute
Robert A. Lovett, U.S. Secretary of Defense, partner in Brown Brothers Harriman, and member of "The Wise Men"
Leslie Wexner, founder of Victoria's Secret, purchased Greg Norman's property in 2022
Jock Whitney, publisher, U.S. Ambassador to Britain, and president of the Museum of Modern Art

Sports and entertainment
Celine Dion, singer
Alan Jackson, singer
Greg Norman, professional golfer who sold his Jupiter Island property in April 2022 to the Leslie Wexner family
Gary Player, professional golfer
Nick Price, professional golfer
Lee Trevino, professional golfer
Tiger Woods, professional golfer

References

External links
 

Hobe Sound, Florida
Towns in Martin County, Florida
Port St. Lucie metropolitan area
Towns in Florida
Populated coastal places in Florida on the Atlantic Ocean
Beaches of Martin County, Florida
Beaches of Florida